El Niño is a city in Baja California in Tijuana Municipality. The city had a population of 8,999 as of 2010.

References

Populated places in Tijuana Municipality